A postal museum is a museum dedicated to the display of objects relating to the postal service. A subcategory of postal museums are philatelic museums, which focus on philately and postage stamps.

List of postal and philatelic museums

Africa

Egypt
The Post Museum

Ethiopia
Ethiopian National Postal Museum

Kenya
German Post Office Museum

Mauritius

Blue Penny Museum
Mauritius Postal Museum

Morocco
Postal Museum

South Africa
South African Post Office Museum

Americas

Brazil

 Philatelic and Numismatic Brazilian Museum

Canada

Canadian Postal Museum (closed)
First Toronto Post Office

Costa Rica
Museo Filatélico de Costa Rica

Cuba
Cuban Postal Museum

Curaçao
 Postal Museum Curaçao

Guatemala
Guatemalan Postal & Philatelic Museum

Mexico
 Philatelic Museum of Oaxaca – Mexico

Peru

National Postal and Philatelic Museum

United States
Florida Postal Museum
Franklin Post Office
Garnier Post Office Museum
Leon Myers Stamp Center
National Philatelic Museum (closed)
National Postal Museum
Spellman Museum of Stamps & Postal History
The Museum of Postal History
US Postal Museum

Asia

Bangladesh
Philatelic Museum

Bhutan
Bhutan Postal Museum.

China

China National Postal and Stamp Museum
Shanghai Postal Museum

Hong Kong
 The Postal Gallery

India
 National Philatelic Museum
 Philatelic Museum (Bangalore)
 Postal Museum (Kolkata)
 Postal Museum (Mysore)

Indonesia
Indonesian Stamp Museum

Israel
Alexander Museum of Postal History and Philately

Japan
Communications Museum of Japan – Ote-machi, Chiyoda-ku, Tokyo
Postal Museum Japan
Philatelic Culture Museum (Arima, Kobe)
Philatelic Museum (Mejiro, Tokyo)

Malaysia

Malacca Stamp Museum

North Korea
Korea Stamp Museum

Pakistan
Pakistan Postal Museum – Karachi
Siddiqui Philatelic Museum, 22-J-Z Madina Town, Faisalabad

Saudi Arabia
The Postal Museum, Riyadh

Singapore
Singapore Philatelic Museum

South Korea
 Damyang Stamp Museum
 Postal Museum, Cheonan, Chungcheongnam-do
 , Jung-gu, Seoul

Sri Lanka
Postal museum

Taiwan

Chunghwa Postal Museum

Thailand
Sam Sen Nai Philatelic Museum, Phaya Thai District, Bangkok, Thailand
Chiang Mai Philatelic Museum, Chiang Mai, Thailand

United Arab Emirates
Emirates Postal Museum

Uzbekistan
The Museum of Communication History in Uzbekistan

Europe

Andorra

Austria

Belgium
 Postal Museum of Belgium

Croatia
   Croatian Postal and Telecommunications Service Museum, Jurisiceva 13, HR–10 001 Zagreb, Croatia

Cyprus
Cyprus Postal Museum

Czech Republic
The Postal Museum

Denmark
Danish Post & Tele Museum, Copenhagen
Post and Telegraph History Museum, Århus

Estonia
 ENM Postal Museum – , Muuseumi tee 2, 60532 Tartu, Estonia

Finland

France
Musée de La Poste

Germany

Museum für Kommunikation Frankfurt
Museum für Kommunikation Hamburg
Museum of Communication, Nuremberg, Germany
Philatelic Archive in Bonn

Greece
Postal & Philatelic Museum of Greece

Hungary
 Postal Museum of Hungary

Ireland
An Post Museum (closed)

Italy

 Museum of Tasso family and Postal History, Camerata Cornello (Bergamo)

Liechtenstein
 Postal Museum

Luxembourg

Malta

Malta Postal Museum

Monaco
Museum of Stamps and Coins

Netherlands

Poland

Russia

A.S. Popov Central Museum of Communications

San Marino
Museo del Francobollo e della Moneta

Slovenia
Museum of Post and Telecommunications

Spain
 Postal and Telegraphic Museum of Spain
 La Virreina Centro de la Imagen

Sweden

Switzerland
Museum of Communication Bern

Turkey
Istanbul Postal Museum
PTT Postage Stamp Museum

Ukraine
Lviv Postal Museum
 Post Station in Nizhyn

United Kingdom
Bath Postal Museum
British Library Philatelic Collections
Colne Valley Postal Museum
Isle of Wight Postal Museum
Oakham Treasures, Gordano, Avon housing the former collection held at Inkpen Postal Museum
The Museum of Philatelic History at The Royal Philatelic Society London
The Postal Museum, London

See also
Mail

References

External links

International Postal Museum – Online
Museum of Philately – Online
Postal Museum (London)

Lists of museums by subject
Types of museums
Museum